The Province of Tarapacá was a territorial division of Peru that existed from 1837 until 1883. The capital of this province was the city of Iquique. With the creation of the Tarapacá Department in 1878 the capital was moved to the city of Tarapacá. The province was bordered on the north by Arica Province, on the east and south by Bolivia, and on the west by the Pacific Ocean. Peruvian people constituted a minority in the province as both Chileans and Bolivians were more numerous.

 It was created in 1837, in the Litoral Department of South Peru, a constituent country of Peru-Bolivia.
 In 1853 the Moquegua Department, contained Moquegua Province, Tacna Province, Arica Province and Tarapacá Province.
 In 1868, the Province Litoral of Tarapacá, had Iquique as the capital, independent of the Moquegua Department.
 In 1878, Tarapacá Department, had provinces of Tarapacá Province and Iquique Province.

Political division 
In 1878, this province was divided into the following districts.

References

External links
Gallery Peruvian from Tarapaca
 Peruvian from Tarapacá
Providing that in the provinces of Tacna and Tarapaca, forming a Departamento Litoral
Separating from the department of Moquegua province of Tarapacá  under the name provincia litoral
The new Departamento of Tarapacá
Peruvian "Heros of Tarapaca" – brief synopsis of Battle of Tarapaca (in Spanish, from Website of Peruvian military central command)

History of Peru
Subdivisions of Peru